The Paleohispanic scripts are the writing systems created in the Iberian peninsula before the Latin alphabet became the main script. Most of them are unusual in that they are semi-syllabic rather than purely alphabetic, despite having supposedly developed, in part, from the Phoenician alphabet. 

Paleohispanic scripts are known to have been used from the 5th century BC — possibly from the 7th century, in the opinion of some researchers — until the end of the 1st century BC or the beginning of the 1st century CE, and were the main scripts used to write the Paleohispanic languages. Some researchers conclude that their origin may lie solely with the Phoenician alphabet, while others believe the Greek alphabet may also have had a role.

Scripts
The Paleohispanic scripts are classified into three major groups: southern, northern, and Greco-Iberian, with differences both in the shapes of the glyphs and in their values. 

Inscriptions in the southern scripts have been found mainly in the southern half of the Iberian Peninsula. They represent only 5% of the inscriptions found, and mostly read from right to left (like the Phoenician alphabet). They are:

 the Espanca script (known from a single tablet, and the earliest attestation of an alphabetical order among the Paleohispanic scripts);
 the Tartessian or Southwest script, also known as South Lusitanian; 
 the Southeastern Iberian script, also known as Meridional.

Inscriptions in the northern scripts have been found mainly in the northeast of the Iberian Peninsula. They represent 95% of the inscriptions found, and mostly read from left to right (like the Greek alphabet). They are:

 the Northeastern Iberian script, also known as Levantine;
 Dual variant
 Non-dual variant
 the Celtiberian script
Western variant
Eastern variant. 

The Greco-Iberian alphabet was a direct adaptation of the Ionic variety of the Greek alphabet, and only found in a small region on the Mediterranean coast in the modern provinces of Alicante and Murcia.

Typology
Excepting the Greco-Iberian alphabet, and to a lesser extent the Tartessian (southwestern) script, Paleohispanic scripts shared a distinctive typology: they behaved as a syllabary for plosives and as an alphabet for the rest of consonants. This unique writing system has been called a semi-syllabary.

In the syllabic portions of the scripts, each plosive sign stood for a different combination of consonant and vowel, so that the written form of ga displayed no resemblance to ge, and bi looked quite different from bo. In addition, the original format did not distinguish voiced from unvoiced plosives, so that ga stood for both /ga/ and /ka/, and da stood for both /da/ and /ta/. 

On the other hand, the continuants (fricatives like /s/ and sonorants like /l/, /m/, trills, and vowels) were written with simple alphabetic letters, as in Phoenician and Greek. 

Over the past few decades, many researchers have come to think one variant of the northeastern Iberian script, the older one according to the archaeological contexts, distinguished voicing in the plosives by adding a stroke to the glyphs for the alveolar (/d/~/t/) and velar (/g/~/k/) syllables, creating distinct glyphs for unvoiced /t/ and /k/, and restricting the original glyphs to voiced /d/ and /g/. (This is the so-called dual signary model: see northeastern Iberian script.) If correct, this innovation would parallel the creation of the Latin letter G by the addition of a stroke to C, which had previously stood for both /k/ and /g/.

Tartessian

Tartessian script is intermediate between a pure alphabet and the Paleohispanic semi-syllabaries. Though the letter for a plosive was determined by the following vowel, as in a semi-syllabary, the following vowel was also written, as in an alphabet (as seen in Tartessian). This redundant typology re-emerged in a few late (2nd and 1st century BCE) texts of northeastern Iberian and Celtiberian scripts, where vowels were once again written after plosives. Some scholars treat Tartessian as a redundant semi-syllabary, with essentially syllabic glyphs followed by the letter for the corresponding vowel; others treat it as a redundant alphabet, with the choice of an essentially consonantal character decided by the following vowel.<ref name=Hoz>Hoz, Javier de (2005)]</ref>

This is analogous to Old Persian cuneiform, where vowels are most often written overtly but where consonants/syllables are decided by the vowel about half the time, and, to a very limited extent, to the Etruscan alphabet, where most syllables based the consonant /k/ share neither consonant nor vowel letter: Only the combinations CE, CI, KA, and QU were permitted. (This Etruscan convention is preserved in the English, not only in qu for queen, but also the letter names cee, kay, cue/qu.)

 Origins 
The Paleohispanic semi-syllabaries clearly derive ultimately from an alphabet or alphabets circulating in the Mediterranean, but it is not known whether that was the Phoenician alphabet alone, or if archaic varieties of the Greek alphabet also played a role. 

The only known full Paleohispanic signary, on the undated Espanca tablet (not completely readable, but clearly related to the southwestern and southeastern scripts), follows the Phoenician/Greek order for the first 13 of its 27 letters: Α Β Γ Δ Ι Κ Λ Μ Ν Ξ Π?  Τ. The fact that southern paleohispanic /e/ appears to derive from the Phoenician letter ‘ayin, which gave rise to Greek Ο, while southern iberian /o/ derives from another letter or was perhaps invented, suggests that the development of vowels in Paleohispanic semi-syllabaries was independent of the Greek innovation. (In addition, the letter for /e/ in northeast Iberian resembles Greek Ε rather than the southeast Iberian letter.) The two sibilants, S and S', are attested, but there is one sign too few to account for a full 15-sign syllabary and all four of the letters M, M', R, and R' (not all of which can be positively identified with letters from the tablet), suggesting that one of ems or ars shown in the charts to the right is only a graphic variant. 

The obvious question about the origin and evolution of these scripts is how a purely alphabetic script was changed into, or perhaps unconsciously reinterpreted as, a partial syllabary. Nonetheless, all three were borrowed, becoming the letters C, K, and Q. All were pronounced /k/, but they were restricted to appear before different vowels — CE, CI, KA, and QU, respectively, — so that the consonants carried almost as much weight in distinguishing these syllables as the vowels did. (This may have been an attempt to overtly indicate the vowel-dependent allophony of Etruscan /k/ with the extra Greek letters that were available.) When the Etruscan alphabet was later adapted to Latin, the letter C stood for both /k/ and /g/, as Etruscan had had no /g/ sound to maintain the original sound value of Greek Г. (Later a stroke was added to C, creating the new Latin letter G.). 

Something similar may have happened in the evolution of Paleohispanic scripts. If writing passed from the Phoenicians through the Tartessians, and the Tartessian language did not have /g/ or /d/, that would explain the absence of a distinction between /g/ and /k/, /d/ and /t/ in the southeastern Iberian and later northeast Iberian scripts, despite it being clear that these were distinct sounds in the Iberian language, as is clearly attested in the Greco-Iberian alphabet and later use of the Latin alphabet. In Tartessian script, vowels were always written after the plosives, but they were redundant — or at nearly so — and thus it seems they were dropped when the script passed to the Iberians. 

Phoenician/Greek labial letter Β was the source of southwestern be, southeastern ba; the use of Π is uncertain but may have been the source of bi. (If Greek was used as a secondary source, Greek Φ would also have been available.) For the alveolars, Δ was the source of tu/du, Τ of ta/da, and Θ of ti/di. See also 
 Iberian languages
 Iberian Romance languages
 Languages of Portugal
 Languages of Spain
 Pre-Roman peoples of the Iberian Peninsula

References

 Bibliography 
 Correa, José Antonio (2004): «Los semisilabarios ibéricos: algunas cuestiones», ELEA 4, pp. 75–98.
 Correa, José Antonio (2005): «Del alfabeto fenicio al semisilabario paleohispánico», Palaeohispanica 5, pp. 137–154.
 Ferrer i Jané, Joan (2005) Novetats sobre el sistema dual de diferenciació gràfica de les oclusives sordes i sonores, Palaeohispanica 5, pp. 957-982. 
 Hoz, Javier de (2005): «La recepción de la escritura en Hispania como fenómeno orientalizante», Anejos del Archivo Español de Arqueología XXXV, pp. 363–380.
 Rodríguez Ramos, Jesús (2000): «La lectura de las inscripciones sudlusitano-tartesias», Faventia 22/1, pp. 21–48. 
 Rodríguez Ramos, Jesús (2004): Análisis de epigrafía íbera, Vitoria-Gasteiz.
 Untermann, Jürgen : Monumenta Linguarum Hispanicarum, Wiesbaden. (1975): I Die Münzlegenden. (1980): II Die iberischen Inschriften aus Sudfrankreicht. (1990): III Die iberischen Inschriften aus Spanien. (1997): IV Die tartessischen, keltiberischen und lusitanischen Inschriften.
 Velaza, Javier (2004): «La escritura en la península ibérica antigua», La escritura y el libro en la antigüedad'', Madrid, pp. 95–114.

External links
Iberian Epigraphy - Jesús Rodríguez Ramos
Detailed map of the Pre-Roman Peoples of Iberia (around 200 BCE)

Palaeohispanic writing
Writing systems
Paleohispanic languages
Extinct languages of Europe